Tuncay (toonj-eye) is a Turkish given name for males and a surname. People named Tuncay include:

Given name 
 Tuncay Güney (born 1972), Turkish spy
 Tuncay Karakaya (born 1989), Turkish Paralympian goalball player
 Tuncay Mataracı (born 1935), convicted former government minister of Turkey
 Tuncay Özilhan (born 1947), Turkish businessman
 Tuncay Özkan (born 1966), Turkish journalist, writer and politician
 Tuncay Şanlı (born 1982), Turkish footballer

Surname 
 Ekin Tunçay Turan, Turkish stage actress and translator
 Fevzi Tuncay (born 1977), Turkish footballer

Turkish masculine given names